Qué Despelote! La película is a 2010 comedy film released on August 19, 2010 by NDE Studios. The film was directed by Eduardo Ortíz.

Plot
After several years with his program "El despelote" at the head of the radio stations in Puerto Rico, Rocky, Billy and Tony go from luxuries to unemployment.

Cast
 Tony Banana
 Billy Fourquet
 Rocky the Kid
 Zuleyka Rivera
 Johnny Ray Rodriguez
 Omar Rodriguez as himself
 Carlos Alberto Lopez''' as Carlos
 Jorge Pabon as Lechero

Sequel
A sequel entitled Qué Despelotón! was released in March 2014.

References

External links
 

2010 films
2010 comedy films
Films shot in Puerto Rico
LGBT-related comedy films

2010 LGBT-related films